Moncalieri is a town and comune of  56,134 inhabitants (31 January 2022) about  directly south of downtown Turin (to whose Metropolitan City it belongs), in Piedmont, Italy. It is the most populous suburb of Turin and it is notable for its castle, built in the 12th century and enlarged in the 15th century, which later became the favorite residence of King Victor Emmanuel II of Italy and of his daughter Princess Maria Clotilde of Savoy. It is part of the World Heritage Site Residences of the Royal House of Savoy.

History
Moncalieri was founded in 1228 by some inhabitants of Testona (now a frazione of the comune of Moncalieri) as a refuge from the assaults from Chieri. The easy access to the Po River and the bridge (a Templar possession for a long time) that it commanded granted a certain flourishing to the city, which became a free comune and housed a number of monastic institutions.

In the 17th century it was acquired by the House of Savoy, whose members often lived in their castle here during the summer. During the unification of Italy it was the site of the famous Proclamation of Moncalieri. Having maintained its tradition as a summer resort, today Moncalieri is also home to many high technology companies.

Main sights

The castle is one of the Savoy Residences listed as a World Heritage Site. It hosts since 1919 a prestigious carabinieri school.

Close to the castle, the descending square of Piazza Vittorio Emanuele II was in the past the major centre for the Moncalieri activities. Its cobbled pavement was built back in 1825, and a sculpture-fountain of Neptune (Il Saturnio) can be found in the top part of it. For aesthetic as well as practical reasons, the Neptune fountain was several times moved back and forth. A small passage connects this square to the prestigious Real Collegio Carlo Alberto, school aimed for aristocratic descendants. Nowadays, the Collegio Carlo Alberto is managed by a joint initiative of the Compagnia di San Paolo and the University of Turin; their mission is to foster research and teaching in law, economics, finance and political science.

The Gothic church of Santa Maria della Scala houses the remains of the local patron. Other churches of interest are the later San Francesco, Sant'Egidio and the Chiesa del Gesù.

Culture
Moncalieri is devoted to Beato Bernardo: around the day dedicated to him (July 12), a historical reconstruction of his arrival in Moncalieri from Baden-Baden in 1458 is held.

Libraries and Research Centers
Biblioteca Europea di Cultura "Victor Del Litto"
C.I.R.V.I. (Centro Interuniversitario di Ricerche sul Viaggio in Italia)

Notable people
 Pietro Canonica (1869 – 1959), sculptor and senator for life
 Luca Frigo (born 1993), ice hockey player
 Gabriele Ponte (born 1982), DJ and producer

International relations

Twin towns – Sister cities
Moncalieri is twinned with:

 Baden-Baden, Germany
 Argyroupoli, Greece

References

External links

 
Cities and towns in Piedmont